Theobald Brooks "Theo" Lengyel (born September 30, 1969) is a musician best known as the former alto saxophonist for the influential experimental-rock band Mr. Bungle.

Lengyel first worked with the band on the demo "The Raging Wrath of the Easter Bunny," and later joined as a full-time member. He appears on the band's first two major label albums, Mr. Bungle (1991) and Disco Volante (1995), and also appears along with several other Mr. Bungle members as a special guest on the Melt Banana song "Area 877 [Phoenix Mix]", from their 1998 album Charlie. According to Mr. Bungle bassist Trevor Dunn, "we unanimously decided to go on without him because he wasn't growing with the rest of the band and we were running out of things for him to do. He got pissed off and I haven't heard from him since."

Miscellaneous
His family name means Polish in Hungarian.

References

External links
  Theo Lengyel Biography

American rock saxophonists
American male saxophonists
American people of Hungarian descent
Mr. Bungle members
Living people
1970 births
21st-century American saxophonists
21st-century American male musicians